Isniq (Serbian: Istinić/Истинић) is a settlement north of Deçan in Western Kosovo about 45 miles (or 72 km) west of Pristina. The village is based on the plains of Dukagjini at the foot of the Accursed Mountains next to the Deçani's White Drin River and is the biggest village in Kosovo. Medicinal plants grow at the mountains of 2656 meters above the sea. Berit Backer wrote a book about the region.

History 
In the medieval ages, the village was part of the Decani monastic estate and two families ruled it. During the Ottoman era, the village was split into three timers (military estates) led by three knights. Many inhabitants gradually embraced Islam in the 18th century. Isniq is mentioned in the Lahuta e Malcis. Throughout history, the Albanian inhabitants in the area lived according to codes of conduct based on the Kanun. On September 29, 1998, Yugoslav forces gave an ultimatum to the Albanian insurgents in the village to surrender their weapons, and after agreeing to do so, a total of 735 arms were collected. Many inhabitants were also expelled and fired upon from Serb paramilitary bases.

Notes and references
Notes:

References:

Villages in Deçan